
Year 647 (DCXLVII) was a common year starting on Monday (link will display the full calendar) of the Julian calendar. The denomination 647 for this year has been used since the early medieval period, when the Anno Domini calendar era became the prevalent method in Europe for naming years.

Events 
 By place 
 Byzantine Empire 
 Arab–Byzantine War: An Arab army (20,000 men) under Abdullah ibn Sa'ad invades the Byzantine Exarchate of Africa. It conquers Tripolitania and the city of Sufetula, 150 miles (240 km) south of Carthage. 
 Self-proclaimed emperor Gregory the Patrician is killed during the Arab invasion at Sufetula. Africa returns to imperial allegiance after his death, but the foundation of Byzantine rule is fatally undermined.

 Asia 
 Emperor Taizong of the Tang Dynasty sends a Chinese mission to study Indian techniques of sugar manufacturing, at Bihar in the Ganges Valley.
 Taizong establishes a Chinese military government to pacify the former territory of Xueyantuo, which extends to the Altai Mountains in the west.
 Emperor Harsha, ruler of northern India, dies after a 41-year reign. His kingdom disintegrates into smaller states.
 Jindeok becomes queen of the Korean kingdom of Silla after the death of Queen Seondeok.

 By topic 
 Astronomy and science 
 A stone tower astronomical observatory (named Cheomseongdae) at Gyeongju is constructed in Silla (South Korea) around this time.

 Religion 
 Hilda of Whitby, age 33, is persuaded by Aidan, bishop of Lindisfarne, to enter the monastic life at Hartlepool Abbey (Northumbria).

Births 
 Al-Abbas ibn Ali, Muslim martyr (d. 680)
 Itzamnaaj B'alam II, ruler of Yaxchilan (d. 742)

Deaths 
 Æthelburh of Kent, queen of Northumbria 
 Felix of Burgundy, bishop of Dunwich (or 648)
 Gao Shilian, chancellor of the Tang Dynasty (b. 576)
 Gregory the Patrician, Exarch of Africa
 Harsha, emperor of Harsha (India)
 Li Baiyao, Chinese official and historian (b. 564)
 Seondeok, queen of Silla (Korea)
 Xiao Yu, prince of the Liang Dynasty (b. 574)
 Yang Shidao, chancellor of the Tang Dynasty

References